Andrew Leslie Hutchinson (born 10 March 1992) is an English former professional footballer who played as a striker.

He notably played in the Football League for Lincoln City and had loan spells with Hinckley United, Harrogate Town and Lewes before moving into a career in non-league football with Lincoln United, Eastwood Town and Skegness Town

Career

Lincoln City
Born in Lincoln, Lincolnshire, Hutchinson was drafted into The Imps squad during the 2008–2009 season. He made 4 appearances in total in his first season, scoring his first professional goal of his career in a 1–1 away draw with Bradford City. In 2009, he spent a month on loan with Conference North side Hinckley United. At the end of his scholarship, Hutchinson alongside fellow scholars Kern Miller and Nathan Adams agreed a six-month professional contract with the club.

In January 2011 Hutchinson joined Conference North side Harrogate Town on loan.

In May 2011 he was one of just three squad players to be offered a new contract by Lincoln after a mass clear out of players following relegation from the Football League. Hutchinson, however was to miss the entire 2011–12 season due to injury and was released at the end of May.

Non-League
In September 2012 he signed a short-term deal for Lincoln United, but departed after several months to concentrate on works qualifications. He returned to United in May 2013. In October 2013 Hutchinson joined Eastwood Town.

References

External links

1992 births
Living people
Sportspeople from Lincoln, England
English footballers
Association football forwards
Lincoln City F.C. players
Hinckley United F.C. players
Harrogate Town A.F.C. players
Lewes F.C. players
Lincoln United F.C. players
Eastwood Town F.C. players
English Football League players
Northern Premier League players